Edinson is a masculine given name. Notable people with the name include:

Edinson Cavani (born 1987), Uruguayan footballer
Edinson Vólquez (born 1983), Dominican Republic baseball player

See also
Edison (name)

Masculine given names